Orvar Löfgren (born 1943) is a Swedish professor emeritus of ethnology at Lund University in Sweden. Löfgren received his Ph.D. in European ethnology in 1978 for his dissertation, "Maritime hunters in industrial society: the transformation of a Swedish fishing community 1800-1970." He was Professor of European Ethnology at Lund University from 1991 to 2008, and a visiting professor at University of California, Santa Cruz, in 1983, 1986 and 1997.

Among his contributions to ethnological research, Löfgren has been innovative in his broad views of source material. He has studied the everyday conditions of consumption, leisure, travel, tourism, adventure tourism, and cross-border transnational activities such as in the Öresund Region in connection with the Öresund Bridge. He has also published on issues relating to the development of  national identity in Sweden. He is the author of ten books and dozens of articles in academic journals.

Löfgren was awarded an honorary doctorate at the University of Copenhagen in 2008, and received the Gösta Berg medal the same year. He is a member of the Royal Academy of Letters and, since 1995, has been a foreign member of the Finnish Society of Sciences and Letters.

Bibliography 
Exploring Everyday Life: Strategies for Ethnography and Cultural Analysis (2015)
Coping With Excess: How Organizations, Communities and Individuals Manage Overflows (2014), with Barbara Czarniawska
Managing Overflow in Affluent Societies (2012), with Barbara Czarniawska
The Secret World of Doing Nothing (2010), with Billy Ehn
Double Homes, Double Lives? (2007)
Magic, Culture and the New Economy (2006), with Robert Willim
Off the Edge: Experiments in Cultural Analysis (2006), with Richard Wilk
Kulturanalyser (2001)
On Holiday: A History of Vacationing (1999)
Culture Builders: A Historical Anthropology of Middle-class Life (1987), with Jonas Frykman
Myter om svensken (1984), with David Gaunt

References

External links
Löfgren on Google Scholar

1943 births
Living people
Academic staff of Lund University
Swedish ethnologists